The Strange Case of Alice Cooper is a live concert video released in September 1979, of Alice Cooper performing with his backing band The Ultra Latex Band. The concert was filmed on April 9, 1979 during Cooper's 'Madhouse Rock' Tour in San Diego, California, at the San Diego Sports Arena, in support of the album From The Inside.

Two songs that were performed during the filming, All Strapped Up and Dead Babies, were omitted from the film for unknown reasons. A DVD version, with audio commentary by Alice Cooper, was released May 22, 2012 via Shout! Factory as a US-only release. Shout! Factory has also made the movie available digitally on their network for streaming and download.

Track listing

 Opening commentary and concert introduction (by Alice Cooper and Vincent Price) – 1:13
 "From The Inside" (Alice Cooper, Dick Wagner, David Foster) – 5:48
 "Serious" (Cooper, Bernie Taupin, Foster, Steve Lukather) – 2:50
 "Nurse Rozetta" (Cooper, Lukather, Foster) – 1:53
 "The Quiet Room" (Cooper, Taupin, Wagner) – 3:07
 "I Never Cry" (Cooper, Wagner) – 1:51
 "Devil's Food" (Cooper, Bob Ezrin, Kelly Jay) – 1:01
 "Welcome To My Nightmare" (Cooper,  Wagner) – 2:11
 "Billion Dollar Babies" (Cooper, Michael Bruce, Reggie Vinson) – 1:49
 "Only Women Bleed" (Cooper, Wager) – 2:24
 "No More Mr. Nice Guy" (Cooper, Bruce) – 1:49
 "I'm Eighteen" (Cooper, Bruce, Glen Buxton, Dennis Dunaway, Neal Smith) – 3:57
 "The Black Widow" (Cooper, Wagner, Ezrin) – 5:34
 "Wish I Were Born in Beverly Hills" (Cooper, Taupin, Wagner) – 3:50
 "Ballad Of Dwight Fry" (Bruce, Cooper) – 5:26
 "Go to Hell" (Cooper, Ezrin, Wagner) – 3:30
 "How You Gonna See Me Now" (Cooper, Taupin, Wagner) – 4:21
 "Inmates (We're All Crazy)" (Cooper, Taupin, Wagner) – 3:22
 "School's Out" (Cooper, Bruce, Dunaway, Smith, Buxton) – 1:51
 Introducing the Musicians, with solos – 11:44
 "School's Out" (conclusion) – 2:07
 Closing commentary and Credits (by Alice Cooper) – 1:23

Credits

Musicians
 Alice Cooper – lead vocals
Ultra Latex
 Penti Glan (as Whitey Glan) – drums
 Steve Hunter – guitar
 Prakash John (as Johnny Stilletto) – bass
 Davey Johnstone – guitar
 Freddie Mandel –  keyboards, piano, organ

Other Stage Performers
 Clifford Allen – dancer
 Rosa Aragon – dancer
 Sheryl Cooper – dancer
 Wendy Haas – background singer
 Eugene Montoya (as Martin Luther Queen) – dancer
 Joe Pizzulo – background singer
 Vincent Price – narrator (taped voice)
 Uchi Sugiyami – dancer

Filming
 Produced by Jackie Barnett
 Stage Production Conceived by Alice Cooper, Joe Gannon, Shep Gordon, Rob Iscove
 Recording Facilities by The Record Plant
 Executive Producers – Shep Gordon, Allan Strahl, Denny Vosburgh
 Director of Photography – Sterling Johnson
 Film Editor – Susan Trieste Collins
 Assistant Film Editor – Branda S. Miller
 Recording Engineer – Peter M. Carlson
 Cameramen – Don Burgess, Sterling Johnson, Harvey Weber, John Woodrudd, Carl Vidnic
 Assistant Cameramen – Shelly Johnson, Steve Lomas, Rod Paul, Mike Ritt, Randy Rowen, Patrick Taulere
 Lighting Consultant – Charles Lofthouse
 Multiple Screen Design – Steve Lomas
 Makeup Department – Denny Vosburgh

Re-release
 Executive Producer – Bob Emmer
 Editing Supervisor  – Jo Morrow , Alice Cooper
 Audio Commentary – Alice Cooper
 Audio Commentary Editing – Alice Cooper, Jo Morrow

Notes and references

Alice Cooper albums
Live video albums
1979 video albums
1979 live albums
2012 video albums
2012 live albums
Shout! Factory live albums
Shout! Factory video albums